West End ferry wharf is located on the northern side of the Brisbane River serving the Brisbane suburb of West End in Queensland, Australia. It is served by RiverCity Ferries' CityCat services.

History 
The wharf was destroyed during the January 2011 Brisbane floods. A new wharf opened on 24 July 2011.

References

External links

Ferry wharves in Brisbane
West End, Queensland